Pembe Köşk (Pink Villa) is an Ottoman-era house in the Çankaya district of Ankara, Turkey, which is the city's oldest villa and was the home of Turkish President İsmet İnönü from 1925 to 1973.

İnönü purchased the villa in 1924 and it was used for strategic meetings by Mustafa Kemal Atatürk, as well as concerts, gallery openings, pool and chess tournaments and the city's first ball, on February 22, 1927.

The building now houses a museum of İnönü's personal belongings and diplomatic photographs which is occasionally opened to the public.

References

Buildings and structures in Ankara
Museums in Ankara
İsmet İnönü
Biographical museums in Turkey
Çankaya, Ankara
Historic house museums in Turkey